Kuwait News Agency (KUNA) is an official state news wire service based in Kuwait.

History and structure
KUNA was established in 1956.  It was reorganized in 1976 as an independent body. However, it functions as a branch of the Ministry of Information, although it has an independent budget. 

The agency has a section with the title of Health and Environment which covers regularly updated news on environmental issues.

As of 2009 the news agency had offices and correspondents in 33 countries.

See also
 Federation of Arab News Agencies (FANA)

References

State media
News agencies based in Kuwait
Arab news agencies
1956 establishments in Kuwait
Government agencies established in 1956
Publicly funded broadcasters
Mass media in Kuwait